Bernay-en-Champagne (formerly Bernay) is a former commune in the Sarthe department in the region of Pays de la Loire in north-western France. On 1 January 2019, it was merged into the new commune Bernay-Neuvy-en-Champagne.

Geography
The village lies on the left bank of the Vègre, which forms all of the commune's north-eastern border, then flows southwestward through the commune.

See also
Communes of the Sarthe department

References

Former communes of Sarthe